32 Boötis is a single star in the northern constellation of Boötes, located 360 light years away from the Sun. It is visible to the naked eye as a faint, yellow-hued star with an apparent visual magnitude of 5.55. This object is moving closer to the Earth with a heliocentric radial velocity of −23 km/s. It has a relatively high proper motion, traversing the celestial sphere at the rate of 0.195 arc seconds per annum.

This is an aging giant star with a stellar classification of G8 III. It is most likely on the horizontal branch and is a candidate red clump giant. The star is an estimated 1.46 billion years old with 2.15 times the mass of the Sun. With the hydrogen at its core exhausted, it has expanded to 12 times the Sun's radius. 32 Boötis is radiating 79 times the luminosity of the Sun from its swollen photosphere at an effective temperature of 4958 K.

References

G-type giants
Horizontal-branch stars
High-proper-motion stars
Boötes
Durchmusterung objects
Bootis, 32
129336
071837
5481